The men's fours is one of the events at the annual Bowls England National Championships.

History
The event was called the Charles Wood Australian Cup in its early days. During the 1908 final, the skip of the Upper Clapton team Mr H Grounds collapsed and died during play. The title was awarded to Carlisle Edenside.

Past winners

References

Bowls in England